Lieutenant General Robert George Broadwood, CB (14 March 1862 – 21 June 1917) was Commander of British Troops in South China and also served in the Boer War where played a large role in the Battle of Driefontein.

Military career

Robert was the third son and child of Thomas Broadwood and Mary Athlea Matthews and a grandson of John Broadwood, the founder of the Broadwood Piano Company. He was educated at Charterhouse School.  He never married.

He joined the 12th Royal Lancers (Prince of Wales) in 1881 and participated in the Dongola Expeditionary Force and Egyptian Campaign in 1896. Between 1893 and 1896 he worked closely with Egyptian forces allied with Great Britain and was present at Atbara and Khartoum.

As a Lieutenant Colonel he served under Lord Kitchener in the Battle of Omdurman in Sudan during the Nile Campaign of 1898 launched to suppress the Sudanese Mahdist revolt.  In this capacity he was placed in charge of the contingent of Egyptian cavalry fighting alongside Commonwealth regulars.  At the start of the battle Lord Kitchener placed this contingent on the British right flank to protect a small hill there.  The Sudanese initially attacked this flank and Broadwood was commended in the official dispatch back to the War Office in England for his adept leadership. He was also awarded the Order of Osmanieh (Fourth Class) as a result of this incident.

Broadwood served as a cavalry officer during the Second Boer War (1899–1902). As a Brigadier General he commanded Commonwealth forces at the Surprise of Sanna's Post (aka Korn Spruit) in late March 1900.  In this engagement Boer forces achieved complete tactical surprise and Broadwood's forces suffered over 150 fatalities in the resulting ambush. Broadwood was mentioned in despatches dated 31 March 1900, when the commander-in-chief, Lord Roberts, described him as "commanding the 2nd Cavalry Brigade with exceptional ability and dash throughout the operations". For his services during the war, he was appointed a Companion of the Order of the Bath (CB) on 29 November 1900, but was not invested until he was back in England, by King Edward VII at Buckingham Palace on 8 August 1902.

He later served as Commander of Troops in Natal, South Africa from 1903 to 1904. He went on to serve as Commander of British Troops in South China in 1906.

During World War I he served as Commanding General of the 1st Mounted Division from 29 September 1914.  In July 1916, he was still in command when the division was reorganized as the 1st Cyclist Division. He took command of the 57th (2nd West Lancashire) Division, from 20 October 1916 until he died of wounds suffered in battle on 21 June 1917. He is buried in the Anzac Cemetery near Sailly-sur-la-Lys.

References

Bibliography
 
 

|-

|-

1862 births
1917 deaths
British Army personnel of the Mahdist War
British Army personnel of the Second Boer War
British Army cavalry generals of World War I
British military personnel killed in World War I
Companions of the Order of the Bath
12th Royal Lancers officers
British expatriates in China
People educated at Charterhouse School
Military personnel from London
British Army lieutenant generals
People from Chelsea, London
Burials in Hauts-de-France